The BMW N46 is a naturally aspirated inline-four piston engines which replaced the BMW N42 and was produced from 2004 to 2015. 

The N46 serves as the basis for the smaller BMW N45 engine (which does not have Valvetronic).

In 2007, the N46's successor - the BMW N43 - was introduced. However, the direct-injected N43 was not sold in countries with high-sulfur fuel, so the N46 continued to be produced alongside the N43. The N46 continued production until 2015, when the last N46 models were replaced by the BMW N13 turbocharged four-cylinder engine.

Design 
Compared with its N42 predecessor, the N46 features a revised crankshaft, intake manifold and valvetrain. In 2007, the N46 was updated, which was known as the N46N. Changes included the intake manifold, exhaust camshaft and the engine control unit was changed from Bosch Motronic version ME9.2 to version MV17.4.6. The redline is 6,500 rpm.

Versions

N46B18 

Applications:
 2004-2005 E46 316i/316ti

N46B20U0 

 2007-2008 E90 318i

N46B20U1 

Applications:
 2005-2007 E87 118i
 2005-2007 E90/E91 318i

N46B20U2 
It was used instead of the N43 engine in countries with high-sulfur fuel.

Applications:
 2007-2011 E81/E87 118i
 2007-2013 E90 318i

N46B20A 

Applications:
 2004-2006 E46 318i, 318Ci and 318ti

N46B20O1 
On models with secondary air injection, peak torque occurs at 3750 rpm instead of 3600 rpm.

Applications:
 2004-2007 E83 X3 2.0i
 2005-2008 E85 Z4 2.0i
 2004-2007 E87 120i
 2005-2007 E90/E91 320i

N46NB20 
It was used instead of the N43 engine in countries with high-sulfur fuel.

Applications:
 2007-2011 E81/E82/E87/E88 120i
 2007-2013 E90/E91/E92/E93 320i
 2007-2010 E60 520i
 2009-2015 E84 X1 sDrive18i / xDrive18i
 2007-2010 E83 X3 2.0i

See also
 BMW
 List of BMW engines

References

N46
Straight-four engines
Gasoline engines by model